The 2011–12 Football League One was Wycombe Wanderers' 124th season in existence and their eighteenth season in the Football League. This page shows statistics of the club's players of that season, and also lists all matches that the club played during the season.

Wycombe were relegated back to League Two, after losing to Notts County on 28 April 2012.

League table

Match results

Legend

Friendlies

Football League One

FA Cup

League Cup

Football League Trophy

Squad statistics

Appearances and goals

|}

Top scorers

*Trotta, Betsy and Ibe left the club before the end of the season

Disciplinary record

Transfers

See also
 2011–12 in English football
 2011–12 Football League One
 Wycombe Wanderers F.C.
 Gary Waddock

References

External links
 Wycombe Wanderers official website

2010–11
Wycombe Wanderers